Lio (born 1962) is a Belgian singer and actress.

Lio or LIO may also refer to:

Persons
Leonel Cunha Guerra (born 1987), Portuguese football player known as Lio
Lee Hyung-Sang, nickname Lio (1985), South Korean football player
L.I.O., member of French rap band Sexion d'Assaut 
Augie Lio (1918–1989), American football player
Lio Rush (born 1994), American professional wrestler

Places
Lio Lesong, Upper Baram, Sarawak, Malaysia
Lio Matoh or Lio Matu, Marudi, Sarawak, Malaysia
Palau del Marquès de Lió (Llió in Spanish), civic building in Barcelona, Spain
San Lio, Venice, Italy, church

Books and comics
Liō, comic by Mark Tatulli
Lio Junior, anime character

Abbreviations
Left inferior oblique eye muscle in ophthalmology
Lesser included offense, in criminal law
Liberal international order, rules-based agreements between states
Limón International Airport, IATA code
LIO Target, the open-source SCSI target included in Linux
Lithium oxide, (O), chemical compound

Other uses
Lio language of Indonesia
Ngadha–Lio languages, also known as the Central Flores languages
Lio 'On Famör Rotuma Party, or LFR (meaning "Voice of the Rotuman People"), Fiji
Ford Lio Ho Co. (Lio Ho, 六和 six peace) Taiwanese-based automaker
Lio (album), by singer Lio

See also
Lios (disambiguation)
Leo (disambiguation)